Eric "E" Murphy is a fictional character on the comedy-drama television series Entourage, and is played by Kevin Connolly.

Fictional character biography
Eric, Vince Chase's best friend since they were six, works as Vince's manager. Vince credits Eric for pushing him to become an actor when they were in the third grade. At Vince's request, Eric moved to Los Angeles from Queens, where he was working as a night manager at a Sbarro pizzeria. (When asked what he used to do before coming to Los Angeles, Eric often euphemistically replies that he "managed an Italian restaurant.") Feeling the increasing pressures outside of just acting, Vince wanted his best friend to help him with business and logistical decisions.

Vince often says that Eric knows him better than anyone else; Rita Chase becomes known as Eric's "other mother". Eric is Catholic and of Irish descent and is reputed to have been a tough guy in his youth.

In season one, Eric serves informally as Vince's manager. In the first-season finale, Eric insists on formalizing the relationship; Vince gives E a ten percent commission, plus health benefits. While this new financial bias could potentially skew Eric's actions, his devotion to his best friend transcends the money. This often puts him at odds with Vince's more avaricious agent, Ari Gold, but the two of them are willing to co-exist for Vince's sake. Although not a Hollywood insider, Eric strives to become a seasoned manager. Eric hates being referred to as a "Suit" especially by Billy Walsh. Ari and Eric are capable of seeing eye to eye on issues like Vince doing "Aquaman" and keeping his behavior from ruining the film. Their difficult relationship eventually becomes a friendship, as Ari advises Eric on navigating his way through the business.

Since then, Eric has been busy expanding his job function, getting an office and even starting "The Murphy Group". He has also finally been recognized as Vincent Chase's manager, thanks to an exposé on him in Daily Variety. He briefly signed Anna Faris as a client before being fired for a conflict of interests regarding Billy and Vince's third movie(though this is only implied, we never actually see him fired, and later on in the series he tells Ari that he "has 3 clients"). In the Season 4 season finale, Eric ends up correct about Medellin after repeatedly mentioning that the film was overly long (among other problems) and needed a lot of work before it was released at Cannes. With Yair backing out after seeing how poorly it was received by the viewers at the screening, the film is ultimately sold to Harvey Weinstein for a back-door price of one dollar. Noticing the gang's disappointment walking out of the theater, Ari does his best to lighten the mood by saying Harvey is the man they want to pull them out of the hole, adding: "You should've seen Shakespeare in Love before he put his scissorhands on it."

In Season 5, Eric manages Charlie Williams, an up-and-coming stand-up comedian turned actor, who is played by Shad Moss. During season 5, Eric helps land Charlie a spot on a new TV series called Venice about skateboarders living around Venice Beach, California.

During the first episode of Season 6, Eric moves out of Vince's house and moves into a house that he is watching over for a year for one of Sloan's friends. Later on in the season, Eric closes his talent agency for good and eventually takes a job offer at Hollywood's most powerful management group with well-known talent manager Murray Berenson at Murray Berenson Company with Eric regularly clashing with colleague Scott Lavin (Scott Caan).

At the end of Season 7, E aids Lavin in a takeover in Murray's company after discovering that Murray was reporting to Terrence about Eric's own work performance. This rebellion presumably outs Murray and also shuts down the Murray Berenson Company for good with Eric and Lavin later going into partnership to form the Murphy Lavin Group.

Unlike the rest of the entourage, Eric tends to pursue lasting relationships with women, although he is not above the occasional one night stand. He briefly dated Ari's assistant, Emily. He spent much of season one and part of season two working through a relationship with his girlfriend, Kristen, that ended after she admitted that she cheated while he was in New York filming Queens Boulevard. In season two and three, Eric dated Sloan, the daughter of Ari's former partner at the agency. At the beginning of season four, Eric said that he and Sloan are "on a break", although it is revealed later in the season that they have indeed broken up and that Sloan has moved on.

At the end of Season 6, Eric realizes Sloan is the only one he wants to be with and he proposes to her. Sloan realizes he is ready to commit to a relationship and they become engaged. Eventually they break up again after Eric gets insulted by his future father-in-law Terrence in trying to be forced to sign a prenup before his wedding. This angers Eric that his father-in-law would believe he is only marrying Sloan for her money, causing Eric to agree with Scott Lavin's plan to work together to takeover Murray's Talent Management Agency.

After some time, Eric is told that Sloan is pregnant. Thanks to Vince, the couple reconcile flying away in a private jet together while Vince and the others head to Paris for Vince's wedding. The day-to-day running of the Murphy Lavin Group is presumably being left in Lavin's hands although Eric promises to tell Lavin everything when he gets back.

In the Entourage film, Eric and Sloan have again broken up but reconcile after the birth of their child. Eric helps find Vince additional funding for his directorial debut, Hyde.

Inspiration
The Eric Murphy character was based on Mark's friend Eric Weinstein who is also an executive producer.

Clients
List of Eric's clients/employees signed to his management co. "The Murphy Group" (officially opened in season 4, episode 8 and officially closed in season 6, episode 4)

Personal Assistants:
While at Murphy Group 
Jane (Season 5 to Season 6 Episode 4) 
While at Murray Berenson's Management Company
Brittany (Season 6 Episode 7 - end of Season 6), played by Kate Mara
Jennie (Season 7–8) (also assistant at Murphy-Lavin Group), played by Janet Montgomery
Current Clients:
Johnny "Drama" Chase
Vincent Chase
Melinda Clarke
Bob Saget
Billy Walsh
L.B. and Nick (Writers of 9 Brave Souls which was later renamed Smokejumpers)
Former Clients:
Anna Faris
Johnny Galecki
Charlie Williams

References

External links
 Eric Murphy Official MySpace
 Eric Murphy Official HBO web page
 Entourage Official HBO web page
 Entourage Official MySpace
 Medellin Official web page

Entourage (American TV series) characters
Fictional managers
Fictional cannabis users
Fictional Irish American people
Fictional characters from Los Angeles
Fictional characters from New York City
Television characters introduced in 2004
American male characters in television